The 1999 Senior League World Series took place from August 15–21 in Kissimmee, Florida, United States. Host Conway, Florida defeated Maracaibo, Venezuela in the championship game.

Teams

Results

Winner's Bracket

Loser's Bracket

Placement Bracket

Elimination Round

Notable players
Zack Greinke (Conway, Florida) - MLB Cy Young Award winning pitcher

References

Senior League World Series
Senior League World Series
1999 in sports in Florida